Oncopera parva is a moth of the family Hepialidae. It is endemic to Queensland.

The larvae are subterranean, but emerge from the soil to feed. They probably feed on fallen leaves.

References

Moths described in 1933
Hepialidae